The Sunset Mountains in Coconino County, Arizona are two a small mesas known as East Sunset Mountain and West Sunset Mountain, located southeast of Winslow. State Route 87 passes between the mountains.

References 

Landforms of Coconino County, Arizona
Mountains of Arizona
Mountains of Coconino County, Arizona